The Reserve Antiaircraft Artillery Division of Hubei Provincial Military District moved to Wuhan, Hubei and was reconstituted by Reserve Division of Xiangyang which was activated on September 13, 1983, in Xiangyang, Hubei.

Subordinate organization 
1st Anti-Aircraft Artillery Regiment - Wuhan
2nd Anti-Aircraft Artillery Regiment - Xiaogan
3rd Anti-Aircraft Artillery Regiment - Huangshi
4th Anti-Aircraft Artillery Regiment - Jingzhou, activated on July 7, 2005

References

Reserve divisions of the People's Liberation Army
Military units and formations established in 1983